The Bean Feast is a 1668 oil painting by the Dutch artist Jan Steen, now in the Gemäldegalerie Alte Meister (Kassel), Germany. 

In the 17th-century Low Countries a bean-feast was a celebration at which a goose would be eaten and a cake carved up between the people present. The person who got the slice containing a bean would be "king" for the night. Whenever he took a drink the rest would cheer.

In Steen's painting a young boy, standing on a bench and wearing a paper crown, has earned the right to be king and is being offered a drink by one of the other diners. His mother, somewhat the worse for wear, looks on with pride. In the middle of the floor a man, selected by the king as court jester, is playing the traditional rommelpot, a rudimentary instrument made by covering the mouth of a pot with skin and poking a stick through the membrane. Rubbing the stick makes a noise. Behind the young king another man is also playing the fool by wearing a metal funnel as a hat and making "music" with a ladle and gridiron.

References

External links
 Museum:„Gemäldegalerie Alte Meister Schloss Wilhelmshöhe“: Georg Westermann Verlag. Braunschweig, 2. Auflage 1982 

1668 paintings
Paintings by Jan Steen
Paintings in the collection of the Gemäldegalerie Alte Meister (Kassel)
Dogs in art
Food and drink paintings